The Romanian football team ASC Daco-Getica București (until 2018 known as SC Juventus București) played in the second and third tiers of the Romanian football league system until 2017, when they won promotion to Liga I.

Seasons

Key

References

ASC Daco-Getica București